Coode is a surname. Notable persons with that name include:

 Arthur Coode (1876–1940), cricketer
 Ed Coode (born 1975), British rower
 Jim Coode (1951–1987), Canadian football player
 John Coode (Governor of Maryland) ( 1648–1709), English rebellion leader and politician
 John Coode (engineer) (1816–1892), English civil engineer
 Mark James Elgar Coode (born 1937), British botanist

See also
 Coode Canal, Australia
 Coode Island, Australia
 Coode Peninsula, British Columbia, Canada
 Coode Street jetty, Western Australia